Clemensia pontenova is a moth of the family Erebidae. It is found in the Amazon region of Brazil.

References

Cisthenina
Moths described in 1923